In the Swimming Pool, Palm Beach, Florida is a 1905 silent short actuality/documentary film photographed by G. W. Bitzer.
It was produced and distributed by the American Mutoscope and Biograph Company. It is a surviving film.

References

External links
 In the Swimming Pool, Palm Beach, Florida at IMDb.com
Swimming Pool Palm Beach available for free download at Internet Archive

1905 films
American silent short films
Biograph Company films
American black-and-white films
American short documentary films
1900s short documentary films
1900s American films